Workshop kitchen + bar or simply workshop is a restaurant and bar located in Palm Springs, California. The restaurant got media coverage due its architecture designed by SOMA, a New York City based firm. The restaurant is owned by Michael Beckman and Joseph Mourani.

See also
 List of New American restaurants

References

New American restaurants
Restaurants established in 2012
Restaurants in Riverside County, California